Ambawadi is an area located in Ahmedabad, India. The major landmarks of the area are the Ahmedabad Central Mall, the Ambawadi shaak bazaar (vegetable market), and the Parimal Garden.

Education
 Sheth C.N.School
 I.I.M.

Hospitals
 Doctor House

Restaurants and cafes
 Havmor
 Honest
 Abhilasha
 City Corner
 Ombre cake shop/As well as bakery shop

Hotel
 Hotel Radisson Blu

Transportation
 Ahmedabad Railway Station is approximately 8 km from Ambawadi.
 Gujarat State Road Transport Corporation Bus Station, Gita Mandir is approximately 5 km from Ambawadi.
 Sardar Vallabhbhai Patel International Airport is approximately 15 km from Ambawadi.

References

Neighbourhoods in Ahmedabad